Surrey was a constituency of the House of Commons of the Parliament of England then of the Parliament of Great Britain from 1707 to 1800 and of the Parliament of the United Kingdom from 1801 to 1832. It was represented by two Members of Parliament until 1832.

The constituency was split into two two-member divisions, for Parliamentary purposes, in 1832. The county was then represented by the East Surrey and West Surrey constituencies.

Boundaries
Surrey is one of the historic counties of England, located south of the River Thames, in south east England. The constituency comprised the whole county but had six towns which were boroughs for some of when it was a constituency: Bletchingley, Gatton, Guildford, Haslemere, Reigate and Southwark - each of which elected two MPs in their own right, these were not excluded from the county constituency, and owning property within the boroughs could confer a vote at the county election.)

Members of Parliament

1290-1640

MPs 1640–1832 

Notes

Elections
The county franchise, from 1430, was held by the owners of freehold land valued at 40 shillings or more. Each voter had as many votes as there were seats to be filled. Votes had to be cast by a spoken declaration, in public, at the hustings, which took place in the county town of Guildford. The expense and difficulty of voting at only one location in the county, together with the lack of a secret ballot contributed to the corruption and intimidation of voters, which was widespread in the unreformed British political system.

The expense, to candidates, of contested elections encouraged the leading families of the county to agree on the candidates to be returned unopposed whenever possible. Contested county elections were therefore unusual.

Where there was only one candidate of a party in successive elections, for the same number of seats, change is calculated on the party vote. Where there was more than one candidate, in one or both successive elections for the same number of seats, then change is calculated on the individual percentage vote.

Parliament of the United Kingdom 1801-1832

 Seat vacated on appointment of Russell as a Lord of the Admiralty 10 February 1806

 Note (1806 by-election): (Source: The Times edition of 24 February 1806)

 Note (1806): Poll 2 days. "Although Mr. Thornton had lost his election for Hull, he resigned on the second day in favour of Sir J. Frederick, who was last on the poll". (Source: Stooks Smith)

 Note (1807): Poll 9 days; 3,296 freeholders cast 4,732 votes. (Source: Stooks Smith)
 Death of Sutton

 Note (1813 by-election): Poll 4 days; 1,641 freeholders voted. (Source: Stooks Smith)

 Note (1826): Poll 5 days; 3,743 freeholders cast 5,740 votes. (Source: Stooks Smith)

 Note (1830): Poll 3 days; 2,977 freeholders cast 4,898 votes. (Source: Stooks Smith)

 Constituency abolished - county split into two divisions (1832)

See also
List of former United Kingdom Parliament constituencies
Unreformed House of Commons

References
Robert Beatson, A Chronological Register of Both Houses of Parliament (London: Longman, Hurst, Res & Orme, 1807) 
D Brunton & D H Pennington, Members of the Long Parliament (London: George Allen & Unwin, 1954)
Cobbett's Parliamentary history of England, from the Norman Conquest in 1066 to the year 1803 (London: Thomas Hansard, 1808) 
 Maija Jansson (ed.), Proceedings in Parliament, 1614 (House of Commons) (Philadelphia: American Philosophical Society, 1988) 
 J E Neale, The Elizabethan House of Commons (London: Jonathan Cape, 1949)
 J Holladay Philbin, Parliamentary Representation 1832 - England and Wales (New Haven: Yale University Press, 1965)
 Henry Stooks Smith, The Parliaments of England, 1st edition published in three volumes (1844–50), second edition edited (in one volume) by F.W.S. Craig (Political Reference Publications 1973) out of copyright
 Frederic A Youngs, jr, Guide to the Local Administrative Units of England, Vol I (London: Royal Historical Society, 1979)
 

Parliamentary constituencies in South East England (historic)
Constituencies of the Parliament of the United Kingdom established in 1290
Constituencies of the Parliament of the United Kingdom disestablished in 1832
Politics of Surrey
History of Surrey